"Nebo" (English: Sky) is a song written and recorded by Ukrainian child singer Anastasiya Petryk and producer Artem Valter. It won for Ukraine in the Junior Eurovision Song Contest 2012, held in Amsterdam, Netherlands scoring 138 points.

References

Ukrainian songs
Junior Eurovision Song Contest winning songs
2012 singles
2012 songs